The Qingjing Jing is an anonymous Tang Dynasty Taoist classic that combines philosophical themes from the Tao Te Ching with the logical presentation of Buddhist texts and a literary form reminiscent of the Heart Sutra. It instructs students of the Tao to practice the elimination of desire in order to cultivate spiritual purity and stillness.

Title
The Qingjing jing title combines qing  "pure; clean; clear; fresh; cool; distinct; clarified; quiet; peaceful", jing  "still; motionless; static; silent; quiet; peaceful; calm; tranquil", and jing  "(fabric) warp; scripture; canon; classic".

The first Chinese character qing  has the "water" radical  and a qing  "green" phonetic element. The second character jing  has the "green" radical  and a zheng  "struggle" phonetic, and was anciently a variant Chinese character for jing  "clean; pure; complete; only", which has the "water" radical and this zheng phonetic. Chinese Buddhism used qingjing  to translate Sanskrit parishuddhi or Pali vishuddhi "complete purification; free from defilement" (cf. vishudda). Kunio Miura explains:

In Standard Chinese usage, qingjing  means "quiet; tranquil; serene (surroundings, etc.)" and qingjing  means "tranquil; clean and pure; (Buddhism) purified of defiling illusion, not bothered by material concerns".

English translations of the Qingjing jing title include:
"Classic of Purity",  
"Scripture of Purity and Tranquility", tr. 
"Scripture on Clarity and Tranquility", tr. 
"Scripture on Clarity and Stillness", tr. 
"Scripture of Purity and Stillness", tr. 
"Scripture of Clarity and Quiescence", tr.

Overview and origin
The Qingjing Jing is a short, mostly-versified text comprising some 390 Chinese characters in 90 verses. It is widely read, has numerous commentaries, and is considered one of the most important texts in the Taoist religion.

Two passages of the Qingjing Jing are attributed to Laozi, with the honorific "Lord Lao" (see Three Pure Ones). This has led many traditional sources to attribute authorship of the entire text to Laozi, so the text exists under a variety of honorific titles that link it to him. Scholars believe the received text dates from around the middle Tang Dynasty (618-907 CE).

The oldest extant commentary is by Du Guangting (850-933 CE), a prolific editor of Daoist texts during the late Tang and Five Dynasties period. Du says prior to being written down by Ge Xuan (164-244 CE), the Qingjing Jing was orally transmitted for generations, supposedly going back to the mythical Queen Mother of the West.

Versions and commentaries
The Daozang "Taoist Canon" includes eight Qingjing jing editions with variant titles. The basic text (CT 620) is the Qingjing miaojing ( "Wondrous Scripture of Clarity and Stillness") or Taishang Laojun shuo chang qingjing miaojing ( "Wondrous Scripture of Constant Clarity and Stillness, as Spoken by the Most High Lord Lao"). Commentaries include those entitled Qingjing jingzhu (CT 755–760) and Qingjing jing songzhu (CT 974).

A slightly longer (and "possibly earlier") version of approximately 600 characters is the Qingjing xinjing ( "Heart Scripture of Clarity and Stillness") or Taishang Laojun qingjing xinjing ( "Heart Scripture of Clarity and Stillness, as Spoken by the Most High Lord Lao", CT 1169).

During the Song Dynasty (960-1260 CE), the Qingjing Jing became popular within the Southern Lineage "Complete Perfection" or Quanzhen School and was interpreted in context with neidan Chinese internal alchemy. For instance, the seventh Quanzhen master Sun Bu'er  took Qingjing sanren  "Vagabond of Clarity and Quiescence" as her sobriquet and established the Qingjing Sect. Modern Quanzhen Taoists consider the Qingjing jing a central scripture and regularly chant it in songjing ("reciting scriptural passages; ritual recitation"). Kohn explains:

Contents
Although brief, the Qingjing Jing is philosophically complex. It synthesizes Taoist and Buddhist theories of psychology, cosmology, ontology, and teleology.

The Qingjing Jing is described by Komjathy:

These Taoist keywords are guan  "scrutiny; careful observation; insight meditation; contemplation", qing  "clarity; purity; cleanliness", and jing  "stillness; quiet; calm; tranquility". Pure and still, one can put things right everywhere under heaven."

Kohn summarizes the Qingjing jing:

Translations

The following versions of the opening section (verses 1-8 and 9–13, reformatted for consistency) illustrate the translational range:

References

Bibliography

Further reading

External links
Qingjing Jing  - Original Chinese text
 English translation.
The Wonderful Scripture on the Constant Purity and Tranquility - An English Translation of 
Canon of Purity and Tranquility Reconstruction of the musical setting of Qingjing Jing published in 1592
Free translation made by Five Immortals Temple in China

Taoist texts
Chinese culture
Philosophy books